Lower Boscaswell is a hamlet near Pendeen in Cornwall, England.

Lower Boscaswell lies within the Cornwall Area of Outstanding Natural Beauty (AONB).

References

Villages in Cornwall
St Just in Penwith